Thick may refer to:

 A bulky or heavyset body shape or overweight
 Thick (album), 1999 fusion jazz album by Tribal Tech 
 Thick concept, in philosophy, a concept that is both descriptive and evaluative
 Thick description, in anthropology, a description that explains a behaviour along with its broader context
 Thick Records, a Chicago-based record label
 Thick set, in mathematics,  set of integers containing arbitrarily long intervals
 Thick fluid, a viscous fluid

See also 
 
 
 Thicke, a surname
 Thickened fluids, a medically prescribed substance
 Thickening, a cooking process
 Thickening agent, a substance used in cooking
 Thickhead (disambiguation)
 Thickness (disambiguation)